Galloway is an unincorporated community in the Town of Franzen in Marathon County, Wisconsin, United States. It is located on Wisconsin Highway 49 south of Elderon. The community was named for Charles A. Galloway, a partner in a Fond du Lac lumber company. The Galloway post office was established in May, 1904, with Aldolph Torgerson as the first postmaster. The ZIP code is 54432.

References

Unincorporated communities in Marathon County, Wisconsin
Unincorporated communities in Wisconsin